Histone H1oo is a protein that in humans is encoded by the H1FOO gene.

Function 
Histones are basic nuclear proteins that are responsible for the nucleosome structure of the chromosomal fiber in eukaryotes. Nucleosomes consist of approximately 146 bp of DNA wrapped around a histone octamer composed of pairs of each of the four core histones (H2A, H2B, H3, and H4). The chromatin fiber is further compacted through the interaction of a linker histone, H1, with the DNA between the nucleosomes to form higher order chromatin structures. The protein encoded is a member of the histone H1 family. This gene contains introns, unlike most histone genes. The protein encoded is a member of the histone H1 family. The related mouse gene is expressed only in oocytes.

It incorporates into sperm chromatin after fertilisation.

References

Further reading